Chinery is a surname. Notable people with the surname include:

Chip Chinery (born 1964), American comedian, actor, and personal finance advisor
Jean-Guy Hudon (born 1941), Canadian politician
Leanne Chinery (born 1981), Canadian international lawn bowler

See also
Chinnery